Delta Pi Delta is a social, secret, Greek-letter, college fraternity located at Mount Olive College in Mount Olive, NC.  Founded in 1958, it is the only Greek-letter fraternity at the institution.

History
Delta Pi Delta  was founded on October 17, 1958 by five freshmen students: Paul Taylor, Richard Barnes, David Thompson, Allen Tate, and Daniel Masterson at Mount Olive College.  The men sought to create the first social fraternity at the young  Baptist junior college despite previous efforts by the administration and founders of the institution to ban such social organizations.

Reverend W. Burkette Raper, a Baptist minister and first president of Mount Olive College staunchly opposed fraternities and sororities or any other type of secret, social organizations or clubs at the College.  In fall of 1958, the five men took a petition to the Student Council for approval to form a social fraternity.  As Paul Taylor’s cousin, Martin Taylor, was President of the Student Council at the time, the petition met little opposition from the Student Council and with a majority vote was passed.

The new fraternity initially took the name, K.A. Fraternity for “Knights of Apollo,” but the name was soon changed as many faculty and administration felt the name was too close to Kappa Alpha Order another national social fraternity.  Daniel Masterson, one of the founding members, had an older brother who was a member of a fraternity at Georgia Tech.  Inspired by his brother’s fraternity, he proposed calling the new organization, “Delta Pi Delta.”  The name was approved by the members and the new Greek-letter fraternity was born.  As a result, much of the symbolism and traditions of Delta Tau Delta were borrowed by the new organization, including a similarity to Delta Tau Delta's coat of arms.

In 1992, Delta Pi Delta was suspended by the Student Government Association for allegations of hazing and a party involving underage drinking.  The Charter was suspended by the Student Government Association for five years.  During this time, the fraternity fell into disarray and went dormant.  In fall of 1998, a group of twelve students were desirous of forming a fraternity.  The group initially approached Kappa Alpha Order to establish a chapter at Mount Olive College, but this action was immediately halted by the College due to the moratorium of 1958.

The group discovered the charter of Delta Pi Delta was still on record with the Student Government Association and could be re-activated with a majority vote of SGA.  So, on November 10, 1998 the charter of the fraternity was re-activated and the twelve new members assumed control of the fraternity and house, which was being rented to college students for the previous years due to the fraternity's dormant status.

Today, Delta Pi Delta has more than 75 members and continues to function as the only social fraternity at Mount Olive College.

Governance
The alumni of Delta Pi Delta own the property and chapter house, which is held in a trust known as the, “Delta Pi Delta Fraternity Trust Association.”  A Board of Trustees of seven members governs the property and financial matters of the Fraternity.

The undergraduate membership is governed by an Executive Council of six officers: President, Vice-President, Secretary, Treasurer, Sergeant-at-Arms, and House Manager.  These officers are elected by the undergraduate membership each spring.

Notable members
Nido Qubein - Motivational speaker and president of High Point University

See also
Eating clubs (Mount Olive College)

References

External links
  Mount Olive College Website

Student organizations established in 1958
Fraternities and sororities in the United States
Local fraternities and sororities
1958 establishments in North Carolina